Charles Anthony Palmer-Tomkinson (born 4 January 1940) is an English landowner and philanthropist, a former Olympic skier, and a close friend of King Charles III.

Landowner
The Palmer-Tomkinson family owns substantial lands in Leicestershire, in and around Birstall and Wanlip, having inherited Wanlip Hall. Circa 2001, Palmer-Tomkinson sold some land at Hallam Fields, Birstall, to Jelson Builders for development as homes, schools, and community buildings over the following ten years. According to the Birstall Post, in April 2004, Palmer-Tomkinson continued to be a major local notable. In the summer of 2010, he donated £1 million to Longslade Community College (as of 2015 The Cedars Academy) to build The Palmer-Tomkinson Centre for post-16-year-old students.

Charles Palmer-Tomkinson owns the  Dummer Grange estate near Basingstoke, Hampshire. The late Major Ronald Ferguson and his younger daughter Sarah, Duchess of York were close neighbours at the  estate Dummer Down Farm. As of 2006, Palmer-Tomkinson and his wife were living on their Dummer estate.

He was appointed High Sheriff for Hampshire for 1994. He is regarded as a doyen of the country set.

Olympian
Charles Palmer-Tomkinson was a competitor in the 1964 Winter Olympics in the giant slalom and downhill events.

Royal connection
Charles and Patricia (Patti) Palmer-Tomkinson have been close friends of King Charles III since the 1970s. According to tabloid reports, King Charles III became godfather to the younger daughter Tara. However, she is not listed as a godchild in other more reliable reports. Charles and Diana visited their home in Birchall in 1986. Charles was the then Prince Charles' ski instructor, according to newspaper reports. This connection meant that the Palmer-Tomkinsons steadily accompanied Prince Charles, even after his marriage to Diana, on skiing holidays in Switzerland.

In 1988, Patricia Palmer-Tomkinson was severely injured, and almost died, in a skiing accident that claimed the life of one of their close friends, Major Hugh Lindsay, a royal equerry, as well as injuring Prince Charles. Major Lindsay and Mrs Palmer-Tomkinson were helicoptered to Davos, where he was declared dead and she was found to have severe injuries to both her legs and her lungs. Her life was saved by her Swiss guide giving her mouth-to-mouth resuscitation. She spent four months in a Swiss hospital.

After Charles and Diana separated, the Palmer-Tomkinsons and their children continued to spend holidays with Charles and his family three times a year; in 1994 this royal friendship was instrumental in propelling their younger daughter Tara into the public eye. As of 2004, the older Palmer-Tomkinsons continued to ski with the three princes.

Immediate family
Charles Anthony Palmer-Tomkinson is the eldest son and child of James, a landowner, who was able to provide a separate house and estate for his elder daughter Jane, Lady Ingram, upon her marriage to a baronet. James was also an Olympian, competing in the 1936 and 1948 Winter Olympic Games. He died aged 36 in 1952 after a skiing accident.

Charles's younger brother, Christopher (born 1942) is a senior company executive, formerly with Cazenove. Christopher's wife, Virginia Viola Palmer-Tomkinson, is a parish councillor. Christopher's son Dominic works at Highland Gold, where his father is also employed. Highland Gold is part-owned by Millhouse Capital, the investment vehicle of Russian tycoon Roman Abramovich, and part-owned (until 2012) by Barrick Gold, the world's largest gold producer. The latter is a business set up by Peter Munk, a relation by marriage of the Palmer-Tomkinsons.

Another brother, Jeremy (born 4 November 1943), competed in the 1968, 1972, 1976 and 1980 Winter Olympics in various events.

Family background
Charles's father's first cousin is the Dowager Duchess of Grafton, grandmother of the present Duke of Grafton and Mistress of the Robes to Queen Elizabeth II, who was born (Anne) Fortune Smith; through other members of the Smith landed gentry family, the Palmer-Tomkinsons are well-connected to the British aristocracy.

In 1931, Charles's paternal grandfather James Edward Tomkinson inherited Wanlip Hall in Leicestershire from his maternal uncle Sir Archdale Robert Palmer, 4th Baronet, on condition that he added the name of Palmer to his own. James Edward Palmer-Tomkinson (then Tomkinson) married Marion Lindsay Smith, daughter of Lindsay Eric Smith and a second cousin of Queen Elizabeth The Queen Mother (via her Smith paternal grandmother Frances Dora Smith).

The Right Hon. James Tomkinson was a descendant of Lieutenant-Colonel William Tomkinson of Willington Hall (1790–1872).

Charles's cousin is Melanie Munk, second wife of philanthropist and entrepreneur Peter Munk. The Munks are also keen skiers, living part of the year at Klosters.

Marriage and children
Charles Palmer-Tomkinson married Patricia (Patti) Dawson. She is from an Anglo-Argentine background, born in Argentina, growing up in "the English quarter of Buenos Aires", reading Country Life magazines in the expat Hurlingham Club. She also lived in Chile and Brazil, and had a British boarding school education. The couple met while she was working as a chalet girl in the Swiss resort of Klosters. She is close to Camilla, Duchess of Cornwall.

The couple have three children: James, Santa (a writer), and Tara, a socialite and TV personality. The two elder children are each married and have children. Tara, who was unmarried and had no children, was found dead in her home on 8 February 2017.

References

External links
 Photograph of Patti Palmer-Tomkinson at the 11 September 2006 memorial service for Bruce Shand, father-in-law of Prince Charles., Retrieved 5 June 2007.

1940 births
Living people
English socialites
English male alpine skiers
Olympic alpine skiers of Great Britain
Alpine skiers at the 1964 Winter Olympics
High Sheriffs of Hampshire
English landowners
Charles
People from the Borough of Charnwood
Sportspeople from Leicestershire
People from Dummer, Hampshire